Xinfu railway station is a railway station located in Yangmei District, Taoyuan, Taiwan. It is located on the West Coast line and is operated by the Taiwan Railways Administration. The station is located next to TRA Fugang Vehicle Depot.

References

2017 establishments in Taiwan
Railway stations opened in 2017
Railway stations in Taoyuan City
Railway stations served by Taiwan Railways Administration